Eremarida is a recently discovered extinct genus of lark in the family Alaudidae. The genus is known from a single fossil specimen found in eastern Europe, which serves as both the genus and specimen type.

Species
The following species is classified within the genus:
†Eremarida xerophila - Boev, 2012: Fossil record of late Miocene from Hrabarsko, Bulgaria.

References

Alaudidae
Bird genera
Fossil taxa described in 2012
Birds described in 2012